Flockland Island Crisis is a 1982 video game published by Vital Information, Inc.

Gameplay
Flockland Island Crisis is a game in which the player defends an island from attackers on both sides of the island.

Reception
Stuart Gorrie reviewed the game for Computer Gaming World, and stated that "all factors considered, if you enjoy demanding hand/eye coordination arcade games, then you will enjoy Flockland Island Crisis."

References

External links
Review in Softalk
Review in InfoWorld

1982 video games
Apple II games
Apple II-only games
Fixed shooters
Video games developed in the United States